Sven-Christian Kindler (born 14 February 1985) is a German politician of Alliance 90/The Greens who has been serving as a member of the Bundestag from the state of Lower Saxony since 2009.

Early life and career 
After graduating from high school in 2004 at the Käthe-Kollwitz-Schule (Hanover), Kindler completed a dual degree program of business administration at the Leibniz-Akademie Hanover and at Bosch Rexroth Pneumatics, which he completed in 2007 with a bachelor's degree in business administration. The training included an internship in Stockholm. From 2007 to 2009 he worked in corporate controlling at Bosch Rexroth Pneumatics.

Political career 
Kindler first became a member of the Bundestag in the 2009 German federal election. He has since been a member of the Budget Committee; in 2018, he also joined its Sub-Committee on European Affairs. In this capacity, he is his parliamentary group's rapporteur on the annual budget of the Federal Ministry of Transport and Digital Infrastructure and the Federal Ministry of the Environment, Nature Conservation and Nuclear Safety, among others. Since 2022, he has also been a member of the so-called Confidential Committee (Vertrauensgremium) of the Budget Committee, which provides budgetary supervision for Germany's three intelligence services, BND, BfV and MAD. Within his parliamentary group, he serves as spokesman on budget policy.

In addition to his committee assignments, Kindler has been part of the German-Israeli Parliamentary Friendship Group (since 2009) and the German-Iranian Parliamentary Friendship Group (since 2018).

Ahead of the 2021 elections, Kindler was elected to lead the Green Party's campaign in Lower Saxony, alongside Filiz Polat. In the negotiations to form a so-called traffic light coalition of the Social Democratic Party (SPD), the Green Party and the Free Democratic Party (FDP) following the elections, he was part of his party's delegation in the working group on financial regulation and the national budget, co-chaired by Doris Ahnen, Lisa Paus and Christian Dürr.

Other activities
 Foundation "Remembrance, Responsibility and Future", Alternate Member of the Board of Trustees (since 2015)
 Institut Solidarische Moderne (ISM), Member of the Board of Trustees
 German Federation for the Environment and Nature Conservation (BUND), Member
 IG Metall, Member
 Pro Asyl, Member
 German Foundation for World Population (DSW), Member of the Parliamentary Advisory Board (–2021)

References

External links 

  
 Bundestag biography 
 

 

1985 births
Living people
Members of the Bundestag for Lower Saxony
Members of the Bundestag 2021–2025
Members of the Bundestag 2017–2021
Members of the Bundestag 2013–2017
Members of the Bundestag 2009–2013
Members of the Bundestag for Alliance 90/The Greens
Politicians from Hanover